Anahit is a 1947 Soviet adventure film, directed by Hamo Beknazarian and starring Hrachia Nersisyan, Avet Avetisyan and O. Buniatyan

Cast 
Hrachia Nersisyan
Avet Avetisyan
O. Buniatyan
Metaksia Simonyan
Ye. Sebar
Frunze Dovlatyan
B. Isahakyan
David Malyan
Kh. Abrahamyan
Shara Talyan
Aram Amirbekyan
Vaghinak Marguni

References

External links
 

1947 adventure films
1947 films
Films directed by Hamo Beknazarian
Soviet black-and-white films
Films set in Armenia
Soviet adventure films
Soviet-era Armenian films
Armenfilm films
Armenian adventure films
Armenian black-and-white films